The British Columbia Junior A Lacrosse League is a junior box lacrosse league based in British Columbia, Canada. The BCJALL is one of three leagues that constitute as Junior A within the Canadian Lacrosse Association as the highest level of junior, ages 16 to 21 years old, box lacrosse in Canada. The BCJALL currently consists of eight (8) teams located throughout the Lower Mainland (6) and Vancouver Island (2). Regular Season play begins the last week of April through to the first week of July. Teams compete annually for the British Columbia Provincial Championship, with the winner moving on to play for the Minto Cup, the Canadian National Championship.

History

Inter-City Junior A Lacrosse League (1959-1969)
Junior A Lacrosse League (1970-1971)
Pacific Junior A Lacrosse League (1972-1974)
West Canada Major Junior Lacrosse League (1975-1982)
British Columbia Junior A Lacrosse League (1983-Present)

Teams 

Current

Former
Edmonton Outlaws - in 1987 played a 12-game BCJALL schedule, playing each team twice
South Fraser Stickmen (1983-2001) → Surrey Stickmen (2002-2007) → South Fraser Stickmen (2008) → Langley
Richmond Roadrunners (1972-1992)

Potential

Player eligibility

New players enter the league annually through the BCJALL Midget Draft. Teams select minor lacrosse players throughout British Columbia who are in their second year of midget lacrosse, 15 or 16 years old. The order of selection depends on the final standings of the teams in the prior regular season. The last place team selects first, the second to last will choose second, and so on. Players aged 16–21 are eligible to play in the BCJALL. There is no limit to the amount of 21-year-olds on a teams rosters. Each team is permitted to carry only two non-British Columbian players.

Minto Cup

Champions

The Minto Cup has been captured by a BCJALL team 8 times since the league's reformation in 1983

The Minto Cup was also won 12 times by teams from British Columbia between 1948 and 1988:

British Columbian teams saw some success between 1901 and 1909 when the Minto Cup was played for as the Canadian Senior National Championship, New Westminster Salmonbellies winning in 1908 and 1909. As the Canadian Professional Championship, the West dominated the Minto Cup, never relenting between 1910 and 1924. The Salmonbellies winning nine and Vancouver winning three as the Vancouver Lacrosse Club, Vancouver Greenshirts, and Vancouver Terminals.

Records and awards
Individual records
 Most Goals in a Season: 115, Kevin Alexander 1975
 Most Assists in a Season: 118, Dan Wilson 1977
 Most Points in a Season: 217, Kevin Alexander 1976
 Most Penalty Minutes in a Season: 196, Jame Harding 1998
 Most Short Handed Goals in a Season: 18, Brad Dickson 1990
 Most Points in a Season, Rookie:
 Most Sock-Tricks (6 G/GM) in a Season:
 Most Goals in a Single Game:

Team records
 Most Wins in a Season:
 Most Wins in an Inaugural Season:
 Most Points in a Season:
 Most Goals in a Season:
 Fewest Goals Against in a Season:
 Most Power Play Goals in a Season:

Annual awards
Bill Dickinson Trophy - Scoring Champion: 2013, Cody Nass (Delta Islanders/New Westminster Salmonbellies)
Delmonico Trophy - Most Valuable Player: 2013, Cody Nass (Delta Islanders/New Westminster Salmonbellies)
Monty Leahy Memorial Trophy - Top Goal Tender: 2013, Davide DiRuscio (Coquitlam Adanacs)
Marholis Gilson Award - Rookie of the Year: 2013, Cody Nass (Delta Islanders/New Westminster Salmonbellies)
Keith McEachren Trophy - Most Sportsmanlike Player: 2013, Brandon Bull (Langley Thunder)
John Urban Award - Graduating Player Award: 2013, Chris Wardle (Victoria Shamrocks)
Al Boles Memorial Trophy - Most Inspirational Player: 2013, Peter Dubenski (Nanaimo Timbermen)
Doug Hazelwood Memorial Trophy - Coach of the Year: 2013, Neil Doddridge (Coquitlam Junior Adanacs)

External links
British Columbia Junior A Lacrosse League
Canadian Lacrosse Almanac - by Dave Stewart-Candy
Wampers Bible of Lacrosse
 Short Handed Goal Record at 14:15  

4
Youth sport in Canada